Mercer County is the name of several counties in the United States:

 Mercer County, New Jersey
 Mercer County, Illinois
 Mercer County, Kentucky 
 Mercer County, Missouri 
 Mercer County, North Dakota
 Mercer County, Ohio 
 Mercer County, Pennsylvania
 Mercer County, Virginia, has existed twice; the two counties continue in existence with the same name in Kentucky and West Virginia
 Mercer County, West Virginia